Polavaram may refer to:

Polavaram, Eluru district, a village in Andhra Pradesh
Polavaram, Krishna district, a village in Andhra Pradesh
I. Polavaram, East Godavari district, a village in Andhra Pradesh
I. Polavaram mandal, the mandal containing I. Polavaram village
Polavaram (Assembly constituency), a constituency of the Andhra Pradesh Legislative Assembly
Polavaram mandal, the mandal containing the village of Polavaram, Eluru district

See also
Polavaram Project, a multipurpose irrigation project